Hussainiwala National Martyrs Memorial in memory of the Indian freedom fighters Bhagat Singh, Sukhdev Thapar and Shivaram Rajguru, is at Hussainiwala village, near Firozpur city in Firozpur district of the Punjab, India. A daily flag lowering ceremony, similar to the Wagah-Attari border ceremony is also held here jointly by the Indian and Pakistani armed forces.

Martyrs Memorial 
The memorial marks the location on the banks of the Sutlej river where Bhagat Singh, Sukhdev and Rajguru were cremated on 23 March 1931.  After they were hanged in the Lahore Central Jail, the back wall was broken by the jail authorities and  their bodies were secretly brought to this memorial and cremated without any ceremony. The BSF has showcased the pistol with which Bhagat Singh killed British officer Saunders. It is also the cremation place of Batukeshwar Dutt, who died in 1965 and had also been involved in bombing the Central Legislative Assembly with Singh. His last wish was to be cremated at the same place. The mother of Bhagat Singh, Vidyawati, was also cremated there in accordance with her last wish.

After the Partition of India, the cremation spot became a part of Pakistan but on 17 January 1961 it was returned to India in exchange for 12 villages near the Sulemanki Headworks (Fazilka).This action of government was due to the pressure of AISF the student organization of CPI. The activists of AISF and AIYF conducted mass gatherings and protest to return Hussainiwala. The part of remains of Old railway line connecting Ferozpur with Lahore is also preserved here.

Annual mela
Every year, on 23 March, the Shaheedi Mela is observed at the memorial. The day is also observed across the state of Punjab.

Flag lowering ceremony
A daily ceremony is held here in the evening at Hussainiwala-Ganda Singh Wala border.

See also
 Border ceremonies of India
 Borders of India
 Jallianwala Bagh
 Look-East Connectivity projects
 Look East policy (India)

References 

History of Punjab
Tourist attractions in Punjab, India
Memorials to Bhagat Singh
1968 establishments in Punjab, India
Martyrs' monuments and memorials
Firozpur district
Monuments and memorials in Punjab, India